Saint Marcellus's flood or  ('Great Drowning of Men') was an intense extratropical cyclone, coinciding with a new moon, which swept across the British Isles, the Netherlands, northern Germany, and Denmark (including Schleswig/Southern Jutland) around 16 January 1362 (OS), causing at least 25,000 deaths. The storm tide is also called the "Second St. Marcellus flood" because it peaked on 16 January, the feast day of St. Marcellus. A previous "First St. Marcellus flood" drowned 36,000 people along the coasts of West Friesland and Groningen on 16 January 1219.

An immense storm tide from the North Sea swept far inland from England and the Netherlands to Denmark and the German coast, breaking up islands, making parts of the mainland into islands, and wiping out entire towns and districts. These included Rungholt, said to have been located on the island of Strand in North Frisia, Ravenser Odd in East Yorkshire, and the harbour of Dunwich.

This storm tide, along with others of like size in the 13th century and 14th century, played a part in the formation of the Zuiderzee, and was characteristic of the unsettled and changeable weather in northern Europe at the beginning of the Little Ice Age.

See also
Floods in the Netherlands
Storm tides of the North Sea

References

 	

Floods in the Netherlands
Floods in Germany
Floods in England
Natural disasters in Denmark
European windstorms
1362 in England
14th century in the Netherlands
14th-century meteorology
Storm tides of the North Sea
14th-century floods
1362 in Europe
1360s in Denmark
1360s in the Holy Roman Empire
Medieval weather events